The 1994 Giro del Trentino was the 18th edition of the Tour of the Alps cycle race and was held on 10 May to 13 May 1994. The race started in Arco and finished in Riva del Garda. The race was won by Moreno Argentin.

General classification

References

1994
1994 in road cycling
1994 in Italian sport
May 1994 sports events in Europe